Everlasting Glory is a 1974 Taiwanese historical war drama film directed by Ting Shan-hsi and starring Ko Chun-hsiung and Hsu Feng in the Second Sino-Japanese war. It was filmed in Taiwan.

Synopsis
Gen. Cheng Tsu-chung, the Mars of China, is held in high esteem, even by his enemies.

External links 
 
 
 

1974 films
Taiwanese war films
Taiwanese epic films
Second Sino-Japanese War films
Central Motion Picture Corporation films
Films directed by Ting Shan-hsi
1974 war films
1970s Mandarin-language films